Karl Schneider (born 16 December 1902, date of death unknown) was an Austrian footballer. He played in eight matches for the Austria national football team from 1926 to 1928.

References

External links
 

1902 births
Year of death missing
Austrian footballers
Austria international footballers
Place of birth missing
Association footballers not categorized by position